Ibrahim Hazimeh (born 1933 in Acco, Palestine) is a Palestinian artist.

Career
In 1948, he and his family suffered expulsion and they lived in Lebanon and Lattakia, Syria as refugees. In Lattakia, he worked as an art teacher and a bookkeeper.  He studied art in self-study and later registered for a correspondence course with the Ecole de Dessin in Paris.

In 1960 he commenced art studies at the Hochschule für Grafik und Buchkunst (Academy of Visual Arts) in Leipzig, Germany. In 1964 he graduated with distinction, with Professor Bernhard Heisig as his mentor.

Since 1974, he has lived in West Berlin. He is the President of the Palestinian National Committee at the AIAP / UNESCO as well as a board member and spokesperson of the Palestinian Artists Association in Europe.

In 2007, he designed the United Buddy Bear for Palestine, which has been presented at the exhibitions 2007 in Cairo, Jerusalem and 2008 in Warsaw, Stuttgart and Pyongyang so far. 2014 in Rio de Janeiro. 142 of these United Buddy Bears (each 2 m tall) stand together hand in hand in complete harmony - representing 142 countries acknowledged by the United Nations. Each Bear has been designed individually by an artist on behalf of his or her native country.

Awards
1957 Cairo Salon Prize.
In 1958 he received the Fall Exhibition Prize in Damascus.

References

External links
 Ibrahim Hazimeh's Art Gallery

Palestinian painters
1933 births
Living people
Palestinian artists
Hochschule für Grafik und Buchkunst Leipzig alumni
Artists from Berlin